Kameničky is a village in the Pardubice Region, Czech Republic.

Kamenicky may also refer to:
Kamenický Šenov, a town in the Liberec region, Czech Republic
Kamenický encoding, a Czech character set encoding
Kamenický (family), a Czech nobel family originating from Moravia

See also
Kamenica (disambiguation)
Kamenitsa (disambiguation)
Kamenitza